The Jefferson Center  is a campus of software development company Bitwise Industries. Bitwise Industries partnered with Promedica in February of 2021 to purchase and renovate the building. Construction on Bitwise Toledo began shortly after the purchase and is expected to be completed sometime in 2023. The campus will include a cafe, restaurant marketplace, outdoor gathering areas, and patio seating. Alongside Bitwise Cowork, this location will host a multi-use space with event and presentation venues available to tenants and the surrounding community when completed.

History
Built in 1911 the building was first used  as a U.S. Post Office until the 1970’s. Created in 1970, the Jefferson Center Vocational Rehabilitation School moved into the old U.S. Post Office building at 1300 Jefferson Avenue in 1972.  The school hoped to be a trendsetter nationally and aimed at TPS students that had issues with their home schools.  Instead of having principals, teachers, students, and a separate set of rules for adults and children, the school was set up with the titles of director, supervisors, evaluators, and trainees.   After much renovation to equip the building for instruction, the school was able to provide programs in building maintenance, child care, fabric service, food service, health care, manufacturing and construction, merchandising, office services, and warehousing.

Despite its intentions to serve troubled teens, the Jefferson Center still had problems with attendance and graduation rates throughout its history.  After a short debate on whether it was living up to its original expectations, the school was spared from closure in 1989 along with Macomber-Whitney High School.

The Jefferson Center remained open until June 2000 when TPS decided to save $15.2 million by cutting the alternative school, along with Old Orchard Junior High and 67 teaching jobs.  The Head Start program moved into the building the following year.

In April 2011, TPS considered demolishing the building unless an alternative use for it could be found.  A majority of the school board has voiced opinion in favor of keeping the historic 1911 building standing.

In March 2019, the Toledo Board of Education sold the building to ProMedica Health Systems for $1.2 million. Following this sale, Bitwise Industries a technology company based out of Fresno, USA partnered with Promedica to open a Toledo campus. Construction began in 2021 and is expected to be finished in 2023. The opening of the Bitwise Industries campus highlights the revitalisation of the downtown Toledo region. Founder Irma Olguin Jr. is from Toledo, Ohio which spurred her to open a campus in Toledo.

References 

Defunct schools in Ohio
High schools in Toledo, Ohio
Vocational rehabilitation